Yo-kai Watch Blasters is a role-playing video game developed and published by Level-5 for the Nintendo 3DS. Blasters was originally released in two versions, named Red Cat Corps and White Dog Squad. The game is a spin-off based on the Blasters mini-game in the main series game Yo-kai Watch 2, and was released in Japan in July 2015 and worldwide by Nintendo in September 2018. Human characters are noticeably absent from gameplay, and players control yōkai in a beat 'em up action style instead.

The story follows Jibanyan and his Blasters team in stopping Yo-kai shenanigans. Players are to tackle various missions and bosses, and befriend new Yo-kai in the process. The game is intended as a spoof/homage of the Ghostbusters movie franchise, and is named after it in the Japanese release. However, due to copyright and licensing issues, the western release was renamed, and most of the overt references to Ghostbusters were censored (including notable spoofs the Ecto-1 and the Staypuff Marshmallow Man, among others).

Versions
The spin-offs' commercial success in Japan led to a free expansion, Moon Rabbit Crew, which released in Japan in December 2015 and worldwide in September 2018.

In addition, a Japanese-exclusive arcade version, Iron Oni Army, was released in December 2015.

Gameplay

In Yo-kai Watch Blasters, you can play as Yo-kai; there are only four medal slots in Blasters, in contrast to the six slots in the main series games Yo-kai Watch and Yo-kai Watch 2. The game has four types of missions: Story, Patrol, Boss Rush (Big Boss in English versions), and True Challenge Missions. In all missions, players collect Oni Orbs, an in-game currency used to level up Yo-kai, buy items, make and upgrade equipment, use the Oni Crank-a-kai, etc.

In Story Missions, you can progress through the story, to become the best Blaster you can be. There are two types of Story Missions: Main Missions and Sub Missions. As the name suggests, Main Missions are essential to completing the story. In contrast, Sub Missions are generally optional; however, some Sub Missions are essential to progress in the main story.

In Patrol Missions, you can explore different towns of your choice; within Springdale, you can choose the location you want to patrol in. Many rare Yo-kai that you are able to befriend spawn here. Players can also perform Mini Missions, which reward players with Oni Orbs.

In Big Boss Missions, you can re-fight bosses previously defeated in Story Missions. Each Big Boss Mission has a selectable difficulty level as well. You can fight the bosses in Normal, Super, and Ultra modes, in increasing order of difficulty. Ultra-mode Big Bosses will require the use of an item called "Ultra Orb" specific to each boss to be challenged. The requirements to get these vary between bosses, and they include: defeating 3 Super-mode Big Bosses in order without losing, Clearing the Super mode of the boss in under 5 or 10 minutes without ascending, and paying insignia for them. Additionally, 8 bosses (Orcanos, Wobblewok, Rubeus J, Hardy Hound, Tattleterror, Mass Mutterer, Kat Kraydel and Hinozall) have an additional Challenge mode, where the objective is to beat a set amount of them with increasing difficulty as fast as possible.

Each mission has a distinct set of objectives. These may include collecting items, battling Yo-kai, etc. If all the Yo-kai in your team faint, or the timer runs out, you fail the mission.

Roles 
Each playable Yo-kai has one of four roles: Fighter, Tank, Healer, and Ranger. Fighters specialize in dealing damage to foes to defeat them. Tanks are meant to protect the team with defensive techniques and even support them using attacking moves with negative Inspirit effects for the foe. Healers' main purpose is to heal the team to help them stay alive. Rangers use different techniques to support allies by debuffing foes and to deal damage

Moves 
Each Yo-kai has access to up to five normal moves: one set to the A button and either three or four techniques, out of which two can be set to the X and Y buttons. Some of these moves are restricted to roles or even Yo-kai. For instance, only Fighters (barring Lord Enma when equipping his bracelets) can use Triple Attack, and Gutsy Bones is the only Yo-kai who gets access to Crank-a-kai Move.

Additionally, each Yo-kai has a special move called Soultimate Move, a particularly powerful move you can only perform after charging your Soul Meter. Your Soul Meter charges when using most non-Soultimate moves by an amount dependent on the move. Some Soultimate Moves take longer to charge than others for the same attack.

Stats 
Similarly to mainline games, in Yo-kai Watch Blasters each Yo-kai has 5 stats: HP, strength, spirit, defense and speed. HP determines how much damage a Yo-kai can take. Speed determines how fast the Yo-kai moves on the field: at a Fast, Normal or Slow speed. The effects of strength, spirit, and defense are elaborated on in the Damage section. Yo-kai can also use Equipment to improve their stats, with the exception of speed.

Equipment 
In the game, the player is given the option to get Equipment items, which can Yo-kai can equip to increase their stats and, at times, net them additional benefits such as increased critical hit chance, resistance to some elemental attacks, etc. Each of these has a rank from 1 to 6 that determines how strong it is. There are several ways to obtain these items.

Creating and strengthening equipment 
By talking to Signiton on the second floor, players are able to create or strengthen equipment.

In order to create an equipment item, they'll need to provide materials (which can be dropped by Yo-kai after defeating them) and Oni Orbs.

Strengthening equipment turns it into another item. Said item will have a rank higher by one (or two, in the case of the rank 6 equipment) and will be stronger than the strengthened item. The player will need to provide materials, Oni Orbs, and even Yo-kai Souls at times for this process.

QR Code equipment 
Some equipment can only be obtained by scanning a QR code. The item will be given to the player directly after doing so.

Treasure drops 
The Bunny Blaster and Virtuous Bracelet are the only equipment items in the game that can be obtained as treasure drops after clearing a mission. They are found as the first prize for the 'Lone Blaster' mission and as the Red Cat Corps boosted first prize for the Ultra Zazel Big Boss mission, respectively

Souls 
After upgrading the second floor's gym, the player will be given access to soulcery. Soulcery is a process where a Yo-kai is turned into an equippable item, called Soul, that grants the Yo-kai using it certain benefits which do not include stat changes. The player can then fuse Souls to level one of them up up to level 10, enhancing its effect; or create rare Soul gems by fusing two specific Yo-kai's Souls together.

Plot

Characters

Damage 
In missions, the player(s) will oftentimes be required to defeat enemy Yo-kai to advance. In order to do so, the foe's HP must be depleted completely, which is done by dealing damage. Damage can be dealt in three different ways: fixed damage, gradual damage, and direct damage. Fixed damage is a set amount of damage that does not vary depending on the target; it is most commonly found in battle items. Gradual damage is dealt by circumstances such as being under the effects of Poison Inspirit and similar, and is a percentage of the target's maximum health that is dealt every few seconds while under the effects of whatever may be causing it. Finally, direct damage is the form of damage most commonly seen; when dealing direct damage, a formula is used to calculate the amount of damage the target will take based on different parameters. Direct damage is what this section will be focusing on.

Damage formula 
The damage formula is as follows:

where D stands for damage, a stands for attacking Yo-kai's attack, p stands for move's power and d stands for target's defense. Multipliers are a group of variables that alter the damage without altering any of the Yo-kai's statistics or the move's power. Random Deviation is a random number between 0.9 and 1.

After this calculation is made, the result is truncated and capped at 9999 damage. If the damage calculated is lower than 1, the damage dealt will be 1, provided that the target isn't invincible when attacked.

Attack 
The attack value in the calculation depends on the move used. For "physical" moves (labeled with a yellow eight-pointed star), this attack value will be the strength of the attacking Yo-kai plus the strength of the equipment being used (combined strength) times the strength multiplier. For "special" moves (not labeled with the yellow eight-pointed star), the attack value will be the combined spirit stat plus the spirit multiplier. Finally, for Bomb Blast, Bomb Blitz, Mine and Megamine, the attack value will be the average of the combined attack and spirit values times their respective multipliers.

Attack multipliers 
As stated in the last section, some circumstances can alter the attack stat of the attacking Yo-kai. To calculate the final multiplier, all bonuses and debuffs the attacking Yo-kai has at the time of performing the attack are added to 1. For instance, if a Yo-kai were to attack while under the effects of Big Attack Boost (+40%), their attack stat would be multiplied by 1.4. If they were to attack under the effects of Big Attack Boost and Double Discourage (-100%), the attack stat would be multiplied by 40%. The resulting multiplier cannot surpass 200% or go under 0%; if it does, these values will be used instead.

These bonuses/debuffs come from different items, moves, skills and such the attacking Yo-kai might be subject to. Most affect both strength and spirit, but the two are calculated separately.

Defense 
In a similar fashion to attack, the defense value used will be the combined defense value of the target. The moved used will not change this

Defense multipliers 
Defense multipliers work similarly to attack multipliers, but there are some differences to note. The lower bound for the final defense multiplier is 20%, whilst the upper bound is 800%. Unlike attack, there are no separate defense values, so no separation is to be made between stats depending on the move.

Move power 
This is the base power of the move used, listed in-game, times the base power multiplier. Said multiplier is calculated by adding any pertinent move-altering effects (such as Hinozall Soul) to 1. For instance, if a Yo-kai has the 400-base-power Mighty Attack on their X button slot while having Hinozall Soul equipped, Mighty Attack's power will increase to 480. This change is not reflected in the move's data.

Multipliers 
Multipliers are any other circumstances that may alter the damage dealt without altering any Yo-kai's stats or the move's power. These include (but are not limited to):

 Landing a critical hit
 The effects of a boss aura
 Elemental weaknesses and resistances

Reception 

Both versions of Yo-kai Watch Blasters received mixed or average reviews, according to the review aggregator Metacritic.

Sequel
The sequel games are linkable with the buster games as well as the three versions of Yo-kai Watch 3 released in Japan.

Busters 2 has not been localized into English and possibly never will due to its low sales, mostly negative reception, and the 3DS family ending production in September 2020.

Notes

References

External links 
 

2015 video games
Level-5 (company) games
Nintendo 3DS eShop games
Nintendo 3DS games
Nintendo 3DS-only games
Role-playing video games
Video games developed in Japan
Video games set in Japan
Yo-kai Watch video games
Nintendo games
Multiplayer and single-player video games